Now Qand or Naughand or Now Ghand may refer to:
 Now Qand, Kerman
 Now Qand, South Khorasan